The 2010 Armenian First League season began on 9 April 2010, and ended on 13 November 2010.

Overview
FC Ararat Yerevan were relegated from the Armenian Premier League, and it was the only club capable of promotion.
 Shengavit represent the reserves of Ulisses FC.

League table

See also
 2010 Armenian Premier League
 2010 Armenian Cup

References

 

Armenian First League seasons
2
Armenia
Armenia